The Knot is the second studio album by indie band Wye Oak. It was released by Merge Records in the US on July 21, 2009.

Track listing

Personnel 

 Andy Stack
 Jenn Wasner

References 

Wye Oak albums
Merge Records albums
2009 albums